In matroid theory, an Eulerian matroid is a matroid whose elements can be partitioned into a collection of disjoint circuits.

Examples
In a uniform matroid , the circuits are the sets of exactly  elements. For instance, the -point lines  are Eulerian if and only if  is divisible by three.

The Fano plane has two kinds of circuits: sets of three collinear points, and sets of four points that do not contain any line. The three-point circuits are the complements of the four-point circuits, so it is possible to partition the seven points of the plane into two circuits, one of each kind. Thus, the Fano plane is also Eulerian.

Relation to Eulerian graphs
By Veblen's theorem the edges of every such graph may be partitioned into simple cycles, from which it follows that the graphic matroids of Eulerian graphs are examples of Eulerian matroids.

In the contracted graph,  generally stops being a simple cycle and becomes instead an Euler tour. Analogously, Wilde considers the matroids that can be formed from a larger matroid by contracting the elements that do not belong to some particular circuit. He shows that this property is trivial for general matroids (it implies only that each element belongs to at least one circuit) but can be used to characterize the Eulerian matroids among the binary matroids, matroids representable over GF(2):
a binary matroid is Eulerian if and only if it is the contraction of another binary matroid onto a circuit.

Duality with bipartite matroids
For planar graphs, the properties of being Eulerian and bipartite are dual: a planar graph is Eulerian if and only if its dual graph is bipartite. As Welsh showed, this duality extends to binary matroids: a binary matroid is Eulerian if and only if its dual matroid is a bipartite matroid, a matroid in which every circuit has even cardinality.

For matroids that are not binary, the duality between Eulerian and bipartite matroids may break down. For instance, the uniform matroid  is Eulerian but its dual  is not bipartite, as its circuits have size five. The self-dual uniform matroid  is bipartite but not Eulerian.

Alternative characterizations
Because of the correspondence between Eulerian and bipartite matroids among the binary matroids, the binary matroids that are Eulerian may be characterized in alternative ways.

Computational complexity
Any algorithm that tests whether a given matroid is Eulerian, given access to the matroid via an independence oracle, must perform an exponential number of oracle queries, and therefore cannot take polynomial time. In particular, it is difficult to distinguish a uniform matroid on a set of  elements, with all cycles of size , from a paving matroid that differs from the uniform matroid in having two complementary cycles of size . The paving matroid is Eulerian but the uniform matroid is not. Any oracle algorithm, applied to the uniform matroid, must make  queries, an exponential number, to verify that the input is not instead an instance of the paving matroid.

Eulerian extension

References

Matroid theory